The Masters Apprentices is the self titled debut studio album by the Masters Apprentices, released in June 1967 on Astor Records. It featured two hit singles; "Undecided" and "Buried and Dead", both of which has been released on The Masters Apprentices EP in February 1967.

Background
In mid-1966 Adelaide-based rock group, the Masters Apprentices, shared a gig with pop star, Bobby Bright (of Melbourne duo, Bobby & Laurie), who was impressed and recommended them to his label, Astor Records. A few weeks later, they were contacted by Astor's Max Pepper, who requested a four-track demo. The band went to Pepper's local two-track studio to record it, : "Hot Gully Wind", "Buried and Dead", "She's My Girl" and "Undecided".  The demo became their debut extended play, The Masters Apprentices (February 1967).

"Undecided" was released as the group's debut single, "Undecided" backed by "Wars or Hands of Time", was released in October 1966 and gradually climbed the Adelaide charts, due to support from local DJs, peaking at No. 4. The B-side, "Wars or Hands of Time", written solely by Bower, is the first Australian pop song to directly address the issue of the Vietnam War, which was then affecting the lives of many young Australians because of the controversial introduction of conscription in 1965. Teen pop newspaper, Go-Set, started publishing their national singles charts in October 1966. By February of the following year the group had relocated to Melbourne and issued their four-track EP (which was self-titled) on Astor. "Undecided" peaked at No. 13 on the Go-Set National Top 40 in June 1967, spending sixteen weeks in the charts.

Due to the success of "Undecided" and the EP, Astor requested additional tracks to be recorded for a full length album.  The album itself is a compilation of the four tracks featured on the EP, five cover songs ("Dancing Girl", "I Feel Fine", "My Girl", "Don't Fight It" and "Johnny B Goode") and two new originals ("But One Day" and "Theme For A Social Climber") written by then chief songwriter and guitarist Mick Bower.

The album was released by Astor Records in June, 1967.  It was later reissued on the budget Summit Records label in 1971.  In 2009 a 2 CD special edition was released by reissue label Aztec Music.

Reception

In a retrospective review Allmusic was mixed on the album saying that the "Debut mixes sloppy covers of popular '60s rock and soul tunes with some fine originals".

Track listing
All songs written by Mick Bower except as noted.

Personnel 

The Masters Apprentices
 Mick Bower – rhythm guitar
 Jim Keays – lead vocals
 Rick Morrison – lead guitar
 Brian Vaughton – drums
 Gavin Webb – bass guitar

Production Team
 Producer – Max Pepper

References 

General
  Note: limited preview for on-line version.
 
  Note: Archived [on-line] copy has limited functionality.
  Note: [on-line] version was established at White Room Electronic Publishing Pty Ltd in 2007 and was expanded from the 2002 edition. As from September 2010 the [on-line] version is no longer available.

Specific

1967 albums
The Masters Apprentices albums